Ambrose ( 340 – 4 April 397) was an archbishop of Milan.

Ambrose may also refer to:

People
Ambrose (surname)
Ambrose (given name)

Ambrose (bandleader), or Bert Ambrose (1896–1971), English band-leader and violinist
Ambrose (Cantacuzène) (1947–2009), Russian-Swiss bishop of the Russian Orthodox Church Outside Russia
Ambrose of Alexandria (before 212 –  250), friend of the Christian theologian Origen
Ambrose of Siena (1220–1286), Italian Dominican teacher, missionary and diplomat

Places

Communities
Mount Ambrose, a suburb of Redruth in Cornwall, England
Ambrose, Contra Costa County, California, US
Ambrose, Georgia, US
Ambrose, North Dakota, US
Ambrose, Queensland, a town in Australia

Natural formations
Ambrose Brook, New Jersey
Ambrose Lake (Algoma District), Ontario
Ambrose Lake (British Columbia)
Ambrose Lake (Thunder Bay District), Ontario
Ambrose Rocks, Antarctica

Educational institutions
Ambrose University, a private Christian liberal arts college in Calgary, Alberta, Canada
Ambrose Alli University in Ekpoma, Edo State, Nigeria
St Ambrose Barlow Roman Catholic High School, a Catholic technology college in Swinton, Greater Manchester, England, UK
St Ambrose College, a Catholic boys' grammar school in Altrincham, Greater Manchester, England, UK
The Ambrose School, a grade K-12 classical Christian school in Meridian, Idaho, US
St. Ambrose University, Davenport, Iowa, US
St. Ambrose Academy, a Catholic middle school and high school in Madison, Wisconsin, US
Saint Ambrose Catholic School (disambiguation)

Religion 
 St. Ambrose Church (disambiguation)
 St. Ambrose Cathedral (disambiguation)

Other
Lightship Ambrose, multiple lightships stationed on the Ambrose Channel
Ambrose Light or Ambrose Tower, a light station that replaced the lightships on the Ambrose Channel
Ambrose Medal, an award for service to the Canadian earth science community
Ambrose (golf), a team playing format
Ambrose, Louisiana, a fictional town in House of Wax
"Ambrose (Part 5)", a 1959 novelty song by Linda Laurie

See also
Ambroise (disambiguation)
Ambrosia (disambiguation)
Ambrosius (disambiguation)
Amvrosy